Double Trouble is a 1941 American comedy film. Directed by William Beaudine under the pseudonym "William West", the film stars Harry Langdon, Charles Rogers, and Catherine Lewis. It was released on November 21, 1941. During production the working title of the film was Here We Go Again.

Cast list
 Harry Langdon as Albert Prattle
 Charles Rogers as Alfred Prattle
Catherine Lewis as Peggy Whitmore
 Dave O'Brien as Sparky Marshall
 Frank Jaquet as John Whitmore
 Mira McKinney as Mrs. Whitmore
 Wheeler Oakman as Kimble
 Louise Currie as Miss Mink
 Benny Rubin as Pete
 Eddie Kane as Carney

References

External links
 
 

American black-and-white films
American comedy films
1941 comedy films
1941 films
Films directed by William Beaudine
1940s American films